Conversations is the first studio album and second album overall from Christian singer-songwriter Sara Groves, and was released on March 20, 2001, by INO Records. The producer on the album is Nate Sabin.

Critical reception 

At Christianity Today, Russ Breimeier gave an unrated review, calling this a "truly outstanding album." Sue Rann of Cross Rhythms rated the album nine out of ten squares, proclaiming this to be "Great stuff from a transparently gifted American singer/songwriter hearteningly offering musical and lyrical intelligence in a scene heavy with disposable Nashville pop." At CCM Magazine, Michele Howe gave an unrated review, affirming that "Conversations is a rare find for those who seek, yes, thirst for honest answers to life's difficult questions", and noting how "Listeners will happily surrender to Sara Groves' soulful, rich vocals, which declare with stumbling humility our ongoing search for God." Kevin Davis of New Release Tuesday rated the album four-and-a-half stars, exclaiming that this is a "perfect debut album with standout songs". However, Allmusic's Ashleigh Kittle rated the album just two-and-a-half stars in the only mixed review and rating on the project.

Commercial performance 

For the Billboard charting week of April 7, 2001, Conversations ranked at No. 35 for the best-selling albums in the Christian music market via the Christian Albums position.

Track listing

Personnel 

 Sara Groves – arrangements, lead vocals, backing vocals (2, 5, 6, 11), piano (12, 13)
 Jeff Roach – piano (1–6, 8, 9, 11), keyboards (2, 3, 5, 6, 7, 10, 11)
 Gary Burnett – guitar (1, 2, 3, 5–9, 11), electric guitar (4), acoustic guitar (10)
 Peter Ostroushko – mandolin (1), fiddle (9)
 Matt Pierson – bass (1–7, 10, 11)
 Tim Smith – bass (8, 9)
 Dan Needham – drums (1, 2, 3, 5, 6, 7, 9, 10, 11), percussion (1, 2, 5, 7, 9, 10)
 Marc Anderson – percussion (3, 4, 9, 10, 11)
 Troy Groves – klong yao (11)
 Greg Lewis – string arrangements (8)
 Solveg Peterson – cello (8, 12), viola (8)
 Sarah Bertsch – violin (8)
 Nate Sabin – arrangements, backing vocals (1, 11), electric guitar solo (3, 10), acoustic guitar (4, 10), percussion (4)
 Michael Olson – backing vocals (2, 5)
 Lori Sabin – backing vocals (2, 5, 6, 10, 11)
 Andrew Brown – backing vocals (11)
 Katie Colbaugh – backing vocals (11)
 Dwight Colbaugh – backing vocals (12)
 Nancy Colbaugh – backing vocals (12)

Production

 Nate Sabin – producer
 Keith Compton – engineer
 Nate Sabin – engineer, mixing (1, 4–13)
 Tom Laune – mixing (2, 3)
 Hank Williams – mastered at MasterMix, Nashville, Tennessee

Charts

References 

2001 albums
Sara Groves albums
INO Records albums